Rouben Ter-Arutunian(Ռուբէն Տէր-Յարութիւնեան) (July 24, 1920 – October 17, 1992) was an American-Armenian costume and scenic designer for dance, opera, theater and television.

Biography 
Born in Tiflis (now Tbilisi), Georgia, he attended the Reimann Art School (Berlin) from 1939 to 1941, studied film music at the Hochschule fur Musik (Berlin) and took courses at the Friedrich-Wilhelm University (Berlin), 1941–43, and at the University of Vienna, 1943-44.

He first designed costumes for dancers of the Berlin Staatsoper in 1940, going on to design for the Dresden Opera and the Vienna State Opera. He moved to New York in 1951, which started his twenty-five year association with George Balanchine and New York City Ballet. In 1964 he designed the sets for the New York City Ballet production of The Nutcracker. He worked with the New York City Opera company, Hamburg State Opera, La Scala in Milan, the Opera-Comique in Paris and the Spoleto Festival in Italy.

He designed either costumes or sets, sometimes both, for 24 Broadway productions. His first production on Broadway was Measure for Measure in 1957, and his last was Goodbye Fidel in 1980.

Awards and legacy 
He won the 1959 Tony Award for Best Costume Design for the musical Redhead, and was nominated for the Tony Award three times for Scenic Design and one other Tony for Costume Design.

The Rouben Ter-Arutunian Design Portfolios and the Rouben Ter-Arutunian Papers are held by the New York Public Library for the Performing Arts.

Broadway work (selected)
 Measure for Measure (1957)
 Redhead (1959) — Tony Award for Best Costume Design
Advise and Consent  (1961) — Tony Award Best Scenic Design (Dramatic) (nominee) 
A Passage to India (1962) — Tony Award Best Scenic Design (nominee)  
The Resistible Rise of Arturo Ui (1964) — Tony Award Best Costume Design (nominee)  
Goodtime Charley (1975) — Tony Award Best Scenic Design (nominee)
 Goodbye Fidel (1980)

References

External links

Biography at filmreference.com
Internet Off-Broadway Database listing

Ballet designers
1920 births
1992 deaths
Artists from Tbilisi
Soviet emigrants to the United States
Rouben Ter-Arutunian
Reimann School (Berlin) alumni
Soviet expatriates in Germany